Gerry Weber International AG is a German fashion manufacturer and retailer based in Halle (Westf.), North Rhine-Westphalia. The business which was established in 1973 as Hatex KG by Udo Hardieck and Gerhard Weber is primarily known for its ladies' collections. Shares were listed on the SDAX index, previously on the more important MDAX index of the Frankfurt Stock Exchange. The company's CEO is Angelika Schindler-Obenhaus.

In January 2019 Gerry Weber filed for insolvency; the projected closure of approximately 120 German shops affecting approximately 450 jobs (in addition to ~180 sales points in Europe) was disclosed in April 2019. In January 2020, the insolvency proceedings were discontinued upon request of the company. In March 2021, the sale of the logistics center was announced.

See also
 Gerry Weber Stadion

References

External links

 Official website

1973 establishments in Germany
Clothing brands of Germany
Clothing companies established in 1973
Clothing retailers of Germany
Companies based in North Rhine-Westphalia
Companies listed on the Frankfurt Stock Exchange
Halle (Westfalen)
Retail companies established in 1973
Companies formerly in the MDAX